The Perkins 6.247 is a diesel engine designed by Perkins Engines.  It was built under licence by Mazda, and was fitted to the Australian Ford F100 series light trucks for a short period from the late 1970s to the early 1980s.  This engine was later revised and renamed the Mazda T4100 and fitted to the Mazda 3 and 4 tonne trucks.

See also
 List of Perkins engines

Perkins engines

Diesel engines by model